Jud Süß is a 1940 antisemitic Nazi German propaganda film.

Jud Süß or variants may also refer to:
 Jud Süß (Hauff novel), an 1827 novella by Wilhelm Hauff about Joseph Süß Oppenheimer
 Jud Süß (Feuchtwanger novel), a 1925 novel by Lion Feuchtwanger about Joseph Süß Oppenheimer
 Jew Süss (1934 film), a British film based on Feuchtwanger's novel
 Jew Suss: Rise and Fall, a 2010 German historical drama film dramatising the creative process behind the 1940 film
 Jud Süß, a 1930 play by Paul Kornfeld
 Joseph Süß Oppenheimer (1698–1738), German Jewish banker and court Jew for Duke Karl Alexander of Württemberg, subject of several creative works

See also
 Jud (disambiguation)
 Süß, a surname page